Henry John Pettypiece (November 11, 1855 – 1942) was an Ontario journalist, businessman and political figure. He represented Lambton East in the Legislative Assembly of Ontario as a Liberal member from 1898 to 1904.

He was born in Anderdon Township, Lambton County, the son of Anthony Pettypiece, and apprenticed as a printer with the Amherstburg Echo. In 1879, he married Mary Meloche. He purchased the Forest Free Press in 1883 with William H. Auld; in 1888, he became sole owner. Pettypiece served as ticket agent at Forest for the Canadian Pacific Railway. He also served on the town council for Forest and was mayor in 1913 and 1914. Pettypiece served on the executive of the Canadian Free Press Association and was selected as president in 1903. In 1905, he was defeated by Hugh Montgomery for the seat in the provincial assembly. He died in Forest in 1942.

External links 

Commemorative biographical record of the county of Lambton, Ontario ..., JH Beers (1906)
Lambton County's Hundred Years, 1849 - 1949, V Lauriston (1949)

1855 births
1942 deaths
Mayors of places in Ontario
Ontario Liberal Party MPPs